William John Hope (June 20, 1900 – August 6, 1962) was an English-American film and television producer.

Biography
Hope was born in Eltham, Kent (now part of London), England, he was the fourth of seven sons. His English father, William Henry Hope, was a stonemason from Weston-super-Mare, Somerset and his Welsh mother, Avis Townes, was a light opera singer but later had to find work as a charwoman. He and his family emigrated to Cleveland, Ohio in 1908. His younger brother was actor-entertainer-comedian Bob Hope.

Hope was a producer for movies and television shows including Alias Jesse James in 1959 and Celebrity Golf in 1960.

Hope died from complications from surgery on August 6, 1962, aged 62.

References

External links
 

1900 births
1962 deaths
English film producers
English television producers
British emigrants to the United States
People from Eltham
20th-century English businesspeople